Godfrey Cass (1867 – 14 May 1951) was an Australian actor in the silent era. Between 1906 and 1935 he acted in nineteen film roles. He played Ned Kelly three times, and also had roles in a number of other bushranger movies including A Tale of the Australian Bush (1911) and Moondyne (1913).

Biography
The son of the Governor of Melbourne Gaol, John Buckley Castieau (1831–1885), Godfrey Cass was born Godfrey Castieau in 1867, one of seven children. As a child he spent a lot of time around the gaol and met Ned Kelly just before Kelly was hung.

He began acting in late 1883 or 1884 for J. C. Williamson Ltd. He married Hilda Fraser, with whom he often appeared on stage, in 1894. His peak years as an actor were from 1903 to 1914, usually playing the villain in melodramas.

Cass appeared in his first film in 1911 for the Australian Life Biography Company, and followed it with two more movies for the same company. Two years later he partnered with W. J. Lincoln to make films as Lincoln-Cass Films. The company survived for only one year, but in that time it made eight films, with Cass playing roles in six of them.

He then returned to the stage appearing in Sealed Orders for J. C. Williamson Ltd.

Cass enlisted in the Army for World War I on 27 January 1915, dropping his age by eleven years, and was discharged on 25 August 1917, suffering from shell shock.

He returned to theatre, working as an actor and director. He also appeared in several films, including playing as Ned Kelly in Harry Southwell's The Kelly Gang. He died in 1951.

Filmography
A Tale of the Australian Bush (1911) – actor
One Hundred Years Ago (1911) – actor
A Ticket in Tatts (1911) – actor
The Sick Stockrider (1913) – actor, producer
Moondyne (1913) – actor, producer
The Remittance Man (1913) – actor, producer
Transported (1913) – actor, producer
The Road to Ruin (1913) – actor, producer
The Crisis (1913) – actor, producer
The Reprieve (1913) – actor, producer
The Wreck (1913) – actor, producer
The Kelly Gang (1920) – actor
The Hordern Mystery (1920) – actor
The Dingo (1923) – actor
When the Kellys Were Out (1923) – actor
Jewelled Nights (1925) – actor
Jungle Woman (1926) – actor
The Mystery of a Hansom Cab (1925) – actor
The Rushing Tide (1927) – actor
Tiger Island (1930) – actor
 Heritage (1935) – actor

Notes

References

1867 births
1951 deaths
Australian male silent film actors
Male actors from Melbourne
20th-century Australian male actors
Australian film studio executives